The Canadian Army Advanced Warfare Centre (CAAWC), formerly Canadian Forces Land Advanced Warfare Centre (CFLAWC), Canadian Parachute Centre (CPC), and Canadian Airborne Centre (CABC), is a Canadian Forces training facility located at CFB Trenton, Ontario, Canada.

History
In June–August 2013 the Advanced Warfare Centre was renamed from Canadian Forces Land Advanced Warfare Centre (CFLAWC).  Before CFLAWC, it had been known as the Canadian Parachute Centre (CPC) since 1996.

CFLAWC traces its lineage to the formation of the Canadian Parachute Training Centre (CPTC) in 1942, in response to a special need for parachute infantry in the Second World War. In 1947, the CPTC was relocated to the Royal Canadian Air Force Station Rivers (Manitoba) and renamed to the Canadian Airborne Centre (CABC). In April 1947, it was renamed, again, to the Canadian Joint Air Training Centre.

In 1970, it was renamed back to CABC and moved to Canadian Forces Base Edmonton, where it resided until 1996. It was renamed and its mandate expanded to become a "centre of excellence" for advanced war-fighting skills for the Canadian Army.

Description
CAAWC is designated as the army centre of excellence for static-line round, static-line square and military free-fall parachuting, and it teaches basic, jump master and instructor courses in each subset of parachuting.  Equally important, within its mission are: the Arctic operations advisor, basic/advanced mountain operations, helicopter insertion instructor, helicopter operations, and aerial delivery courses.  The centre is also responsible for the Canadian Forces Pathfinder course.

CAAWC comprises Headquarters Company, Parachute Training Company, Advanced Mobility, and Support Company (which supports all CAAWC training and also acts as the Canadian Forces Parachute Depot).

The centre sends members of its staff on international courses to learn best practices from allied nations and develop them into specialists and maintains a capability in desert, jungle, and amphibious warfare. A mutual parachute instructor exchange occurs throughout the year with the United States Army Airborne School to foster the relationship between Canadian and US forces.

The SkyHawks 
The SkyHawks Parachute Team is a sub-subunit of CAAWC. It is the Canadian Forces Parachute Demonstration Team, which conducts parachute demonstration and relative canopy work at airshows and special events worldwide.

See also

Pathfinders (military)
Jumpmaster

References
 
 </ref>

External links

Military parachuting schools
Military units and formations of the Canadian Army
Parachuting in Canada
Military education and training in Canada
Canadian Armed Forces education and training establishments
Canadian Armed Forces
Military units and formations established in 1996